The 2000 Family Circle Cup was the 28th edition of the Family Circle Cup tennis tournament.  This WTA Tier I Event was held at the Sea Pines Plantation in Hilton Head, South Carolina, United States. First-seeded Mary Pierce won the singles title and earned $166,000 first-prize money.

It was the final edition of the tournament held at Hilton Head Island as the event moved to Charleston, South Carolina in 2001.

Finals

Singles

 Mary Pierce defeated  Arantxa Sánchez Vicario, 6–1, 6–0

Doubles

 Virginia Ruano Pascual and  Paola Suárez defeated  Conchita Martínez and  Patricia Tarabini, 7–5, 6–3

References

External links
 Official website
 WTA tournament profile

Family Circle Cup
Charleston Open
Family Circle Cup
Family Circle Cup
Family Circle Cup